Shōen-ji (正圓寺) is a Buddhist temple in Abeno-ku, Osaka Prefecture, Japan. It was founded in 939.

See also 
Thirteen Buddhist Sites of Osaka

Abeno-ku, Osaka
Buddhist temples in Osaka
Tōji Shingon temples